The 2019 Maine Black Bears football team represented the University of Maine in the 2019 NCAA Division I FCS football season. They played their home games at Alfond Stadium. They were a member of the Colonial Athletic Association. They were led by first-year head coach Nick Charlton. They finished the season 6–6, 4–4 in CAA play to finish in a four-way tie for fifth place.

Previous season
The Black Bears finished the 2018 season 10–4, 7–1 in CAA play to be crowned CAA champions. They received the CAA's automatic bid to the FCS Playoffs where, after a first round bye, they defeated Jacksonville State in the second round, and Weber State in the quarterfinals before losing in the semifinals to Eastern Washington.

Preseason

CAA poll
In the CAA preseason poll released on July 23, 2019, the Black Bears were predicted to finish in third place.

Preseason All–CAA team
The Black Bears had six different players selected to the preseason all-CAA team.

Offense

Earnest Edwards – WR

Liam Dobson – OL

Defense

Kayon Whitaker – DL

Taji Lowe – LB

Deshawn Stevens – LB

Manny Patterson – CB

Special teams

Earnest Edwards – KR

Schedule

 Source:

Game summaries

Sacred Heart

at Georgia Southern

Towson

at Colgate

at Villanova

Richmond

at Liberty

William & Mary

at Albany

at Elon

Rhode Island

at New Hampshire

Ranking movements

References

Maine
Maine Black Bears football seasons
Maine Black Bears football